Manuel "Manolo" Márquez Roca (born 7 September 1968) is a Spanish professional football manager and former player who is the current head coach of  Indian Super League club Hyderabad.

Playing career
Born in Barcelona, Catalonia, Márquez represented CE Cerdanyola, Santfeliuenc FC, CF Montañesa, CD Granollers, FC Martinenc, UA Horta, CF Badalona and Penya Barcelonista Anguera as a player, retiring professionally at the age of 28.

Manager career
Márquez was started his career with his last club PB Anguera in 2002, as manager. After two spells at AE Prat and one season at Tercera División side CE Europa, he was appointed manager of Segunda División B club Badalona on 5 June 2010.

Márquez took Badalona to the play-offs during his two seasons in charge, missing out promotion in both, however. On 31 January 2013, he was appointed in charge of RCD Espanyol B.

Márquez was sacked by the Pericos on 21 January 2014, being replaced by his assistant Sergio. On 4 November he returned to Prat for a third stint, but was relieved from his duties at the end of the season after failing to achieve promotion.

On 29 June 2015, Márquez was named at the helm of UE Sant Andreu, also in the fourth division. He was dismissed on 26 October, and only returned to coaching duties the following 16 June, after being named UD Las Palmas Atlético manager.

Márquez achieved promotion to the third tier as champions with the B-team, and on 3 July 2017 he was appointed manager of the main squad in La Liga, after agreeing to a one-year contract. His first match in charge occurred on 18 August 2017, a 0–1 away loss against Valencia CF.

On 26 September 2017, after just six league matches in charge, Márquez resigned as manager after overseeing a 0–2 home defeat against CD Leganés just two days earlier.

In June 2018, Márquez signed with Croatian side NK Istra 1961 for one campaign. However, he was sacked on 18 September after winning only one of the first seven games.

At the end of 2018, Márquez agreed to manage Ratchaburi Mitr Phol F.C. in the Thai Premier League. He left a month later for personal reasons, before taking charge of a single game.

In March 2020 Márquez tested positive for COVID-19. He recovered 12 days later.

In August 2020, Márquez was appointed as Hyderabad FC head coach. On 10 February 2021, Márquez penned down a two-year contract extension, that tied him with the club till 2023. The announcement came after he had led the team in ISL 2020–21 Season to achieve 23 points from first 16 fixtures and 4th place on the league table.

Managerial statistics

Honours 
Hyderabad
 Indian Super League: 2021–22

Individual
 ESPN India's Coach of the Year: 2022

References

External links

1968 births
Living people
Footballers from Barcelona
Spanish footballers
Association football defenders
Tercera División players
CF Badalona players
Spanish football managers
La Liga managers
AE Prat managers
CE Europa managers
CF Badalona managers
RCD Espanyol B managers
UE Sant Andreu managers
UD Las Palmas managers
NK Istra 1961 managers
CF Montañesa players
UA Horta players
Croatian Football League managers
Spanish expatriate football managers
Spanish expatriate sportspeople in Croatia
Spanish expatriate sportspeople in Thailand
Expatriate football managers in Croatia
Expatriate football managers in Thailand
Hyderabad FC managers
Expatriate football managers in India
Indian Super League head coaches